I Am David is a 2003 American drama film written and directed by Paul Feig in his directorial debut. It is based on the 1963 novel of the same name (originally published in the USA under the name North to Freedom) by Anne Holm. The film was produced by Walden Media and Lions Gate Entertainment.

Plot
Seven years after World War II, a 12-year-old boy named David (Ben Tibber) escapes a Gulag in Bulgaria where he has spent his entire life where his mother has been taken away from him. He sets out on a risky journey to Denmark, initially believing he is on an important mission to deliver a letter, but eventually discovering that the "mission" was to reunite him with his mother, of whom he has distinct memories. Along his journey, he faces danger, fear, loneliness, hunger, missions and encounters various people.

Johannes (Jim Caviezel), his friend and mentor in the camp, who prepares him for escape, is killed by a guard, leaving David to face escape on his own. David is helped by a guard to escape, who gives him a compass and tells him he must go southwest to Greece, take a boat to Italy and finally go north to Denmark, a peaceful and neutral country. The guard also tells him to trust no one. Since David was locked in a camp all his life, he has repressed feelings and trusts no one anyway, and so feels lost and disoriented in the world.

Along his journey, though he is mistreated by some people, he is well-treated by others. Gradually he learns that some people can be trusted, and to open up and experience his own feelings.  Finally, with the help of decent people whom he has learned to trust, David is reunited with his mother in Denmark.

Cast
 Ben Tibber - David
 Jim Caviezel - Johannes
 Joan Plowright - Sophie
 Hristo Shopov - The Man
 Roberto Attias - Baker
 Maria Bonnevie - David's mother
 Francesco De Vito - Roberto
 Viola Carinci - Maria
 Silvia De Santis - Elsa
 Alessandro Sperduti - Carlo

Reception
The film received mixed to negative reviews from critics. Based on 34 reviews collected by the film review aggregator Rotten Tomatoes, 39% of critics gave I Am David a positive review, with an average rating of 5.2/10. On Metacritic, the film has a weighted average score of 47 out of 100 based on 9 critics, indicating "mixed or average reviews". Roger Ebert of the Chicago Sun-Times wrote: "I couldn't believe a moment of it, and never identified with little David."

The film grossed $288,552 domestically in 226 theaters. In the rest of the world, the film grossed $3,824.

Awards
The film won several awards in 2003, including the Crystal Heart Award in the Heartland Film Festival, the Queens Festival's Best Feature Film prize, and Best Film and Most Promising Actor for Ben Tibber. Ben Tibber never acted in a feature film again.

References

External links

 
 

2003 films
2000s coming-of-age drama films
2000s teen drama films
American adventure drama films
American coming-of-age drama films
American teen drama films
Films about children
Films about families
Films about friendship
Films about homelessness
Films based on Danish novels
Films directed by Paul Feig
Films set in 1951
Films set in Bulgaria
Films set in Greece
Films set in Italy
Films set in prison
Films set in Switzerland
Films shot in Bulgaria
Films shot in Greece
Films shot in Italy
Films scored by Stewart Copeland
Lionsgate films
Films with screenplays by Paul Feig
Walden Media films
2003 directorial debut films
2003 drama films
2000s English-language films
2000s American films